Heywood "Woody" Allen (born Allan Stewart Konigsberg; November 30, 1935) is an American filmmaker, actor, and comedian whose career spans more than six decades. Allen has received many accolades, including the most nominations for the Academy Award for Best Original Screenplay, with 16. He has won four Academy Awards, nine BAFTA Awards, two Golden Globe Awards and a Grammy Award, as well as nominations for a Emmy Award and a Tony Award. Allen was awarded the Directors Guild of America Lifetime Achievement Award in 1995, an Honorary Golden Lion in 1995, the BAFTA Fellowship in 1997, an Honorary Palme d'Or in 2002, and the Golden Globe Cecil B. DeMille Award in 2014. Two of his films have been inducted into the National Film Registry by the Library of Congress as "culturally, historically or aesthetically significant".

Allen began his career writing material for television in the 1950s, mainly Your Show of Shows (1950–54), alongside Mel Brooks, Carl Reiner, Larry Gelbart, and Neil Simon. He also published several books of short stories and wrote humor pieces for The New Yorker. In the early 1960s, he performed as a stand-up comedian in Greenwich Village alongside Lenny Bruce, Elaine May, Mike Nichols, and Joan Rivers. There he developed a monologue style (rather than traditional jokes) and the persona of an insecure, intellectual, fretful nebbish. During this time he released three comedy albums, earning a Grammy Award for Best Comedy Album nomination for the self-titled Woody Allen (1964). In 2004, Comedy Central ranked Allen fourth on a list of the 100 greatest stand-up comedians, while a UK survey ranked Allen the third-greatest comedian.

By the mid-1960s, Allen was writing and directing films, first specializing in slapstick comedies such as Take the Money and Run (1969), Bananas (1971), Sleeper (1973), and Love and Death (1975), before moving into dramatic material influenced by European art cinema during the late 1970s with Interiors (1978), Manhattan (1979), and Stardust Memories (1980). Allen is often identified as part of the New Hollywood wave of filmmakers of the mid-1960s to late 1970s such as Martin Scorsese, Robert Altman, and Sidney Lumet. He often stars in his films, typically in the persona he developed as a standup. His film Annie Hall (1977), a romantic comedy featuring Allen and his frequent collaborator Diane Keaton, won four Academy Awards, including Best Picture, Best Director, Best Original Screenplay, and Best Actress for Keaton.

Critics have called his work from the 1980s his most developed period, with films such as Zelig (1983), Broadway Danny Rose (1984), The Purple Rose of Cairo (1985), Hannah and Her Sisters (1986), Radio Days (1987), and Crimes and Misdemeanors (1989). He earned acclaim for his films in the 1990s including Husbands and Wives (1992), Bullets Over Broadway (1994), Everyone Says I Love You (1996), Deconstructing Harry (1997), and Sweet and Lowdown (1999). In the 21st century, many of Allen's films were shot in Europe, including Match Point (2005), Vicky Cristina Barcelona (2008), Midnight in Paris (2011), and To Rome with Love (2012). Blue Jasmine (2013), and Cafe Society (2016) were filmed in the U.S.

In 1979, Allen began a professional and personal relationship with actress Mia Farrow. Over a decade-long period, they collaborated on 13 films and conceived a child, the journalist Ronan Farrow, who was born in 1987. The couple separated after Allen began a relationship in 1991 with Mia's and Andre Previn's adopted daughter Soon-Yi Previn. In 1992, Farrow publicly accused Allen of sexually abusing their adopted daughter, the seven-year-old Dylan Farrow. The allegation gained substantial media attention, but Allen was never charged or prosecuted, and he vehemently denied the allegation. Allen married Previn in 1997, and they adopted two children.

Early life 

Allen was born Allan Stewart Konigsberg in New York City on November 30, 1935. Though his family lived in Brooklyn, the birth took place at Mount Eden Hospital in the Bronx. He is Jewish. Allen's parents were Nettie (née Cherry; 1906–2002), a bookkeeper at her family's delicatessen, and Martin Konigsberg (1900–2001), a jewelry engraver and waiter. His grandparents were immigrants to the U.S. from Austria and the Lithuanian city of Panevėžys. They spoke German, Hebrew and Yiddish. He and his younger sister, film producer Letty, were raised in Brooklyn's Midwood neighborhood. Both their parents were born and raised on the Lower East Side of Manhattan.

Allen's parents did not get along, and he had an estranged relationship with his authoritarian, ill-tempered mother. He spoke German in his early years. He later joked that he was often sent to interfaith summer camps when he was young. While attending Hebrew school for eight years, he went to Public School 99 (now the Isaac Asimov School for Science and Literature) and Midwood High School, graduating in 1953. Unlike his comic persona, he was more interested in baseball than school and his strong arm ensured he was picked first for teams. He impressed students with his talent for cards and magic tricks.

Allen wrote jokes (or "gags") for agent David O. Alber to make money, and Alber sold them to newspaper columnists. At age 17, he legally changed his name to Heywood Allen and later began to call himself Woody. According to Allen, his first published joke read: "Woody Allen says he ate at a restaurant that had O.P.S. prices—over people's salaries." He was soon earning more than both of his parents combined. After high school, he attended New York University, studying communication and film in 1953, before dropping out after failing the course "Motion Picture Production". He studied film at City College of New York in 1954, but left during the first semester. He taught himself rather than studying in the classroom. He later taught at The New School and studied with writing teacher Lajos Egri.

Career

Comedy writer 

Allen began writing short jokes when he was 15, and the following year began sending them to various Broadway writers to see if they'd be interested in buying any. One of those writers was Abe Burrows, coauthor of Guys and Dolls, who wrote, "Wow! His stuff was dazzling." Burrows then wrote Allen letters of introduction to Sid Caesar, Phil Silvers, and Peter Lind Hayes, who immediately sent Allen a check for just the jokes Burrows included as samples.

As a result of the jokes Allen mailed to various writers, he was invited, then age 19, to join the NBC Writer's Development Program in 1955, followed by a job on The NBC Comedy Hour in Los Angeles. He was later hired as a full-time writer for humorist Herb Shriner, initially earning $25 a week. He began writing scripts for The Ed Sullivan Show, The Tonight Show, specials for Sid Caesar post-Caesar's Hour (1954–1957), and other television shows. By the time he was working for Caesar, he was earning $1,500 a week. He worked alongside Mel Brooks, Carl Reiner, Larry Gelbart, and Neil Simon. He also worked with Danny Simon, whom Allen credits for helping form his writing style. In 1962 alone, he estimated that he wrote twenty thousand jokes for various comics. Allen also wrote for the Candid Camera television show, and appeared in some episodes.

He wrote jokes for the Buddy Hackett sitcom Stanley and for The Pat Boone Chevy Showroom, and in 1958 he co-wrote a few Sid Caesar specials with Larry Gelbart. After writing for many of television's leading comedians and comedy shows, Allen was gaining a reputation as a "genius", composer Mary Rodgers said. When given an assignment for a show he would leave and come back the next day with "reams of paper", according to producer Max Liebman. Similarly, after he wrote for Bob Hope, Hope called him "half a genius".

His daily writing routine could last as long as 15 hours, and he could focus and write anywhere necessary. Dick Cavett was amazed at Allen's capacity to write: "He can go to a typewriter after breakfast and sit there until the sun sets and his head is pounding, interrupting work only for coffee and a brief walk, and then spend the whole evening working." When Allen wrote for other comedians, they would use eight out of ten of his jokes. When he began performing as a stand-up, he was much more selective, typically using only one out of ten jokes. He estimated that to prepare for a 30-minute show, he spent six months of intensive writing. He enjoyed writing, however, despite the work: "Nothing makes me happier than to tear open a ream of paper. And I can't wait to fill it! I love to do it."

Allen started writing short stories and cartoon captions for magazines such as The New Yorker; he was inspired by the tradition of New Yorker humorists S. J. Perelman, George S. Kaufman, Robert Benchley, and Max Shulman, whose material he modernized. His collections of short pieces includes Getting Even, Without Feathers, Side Effects, and Mere Anarchy. His early comic fiction was influenced by the zany, pun-ridden humor of S.J. Perelman. In 2010 Allen released audio versions of his books in which he read 73 selections entitled, The Woody Allen Collection. He was nominated for a Grammy Award for Best Spoken Word Album.

Stand-up comedian 
From 1960 to 1969 Allen performed as a comedian to supplement his comedy writing. He worked in various places around Greenwich Village, including The Bitter End and Cafe Au Go Go, alongside such contemporaries as Lenny Bruce, the team of Mike Nichols and Elaine May, Joan Rivers, George Carlin, Richard Pryor, Dick Cavett, Bill Cosby and Mort Sahl (his personal favorite), as well as such other artists of the day as Bob Dylan and Barbra Streisand. Comedian Milton Berle claims to have suggested to Allen to go into standup comedy and even introduced him at the Village Vanguard. Comedy historian Gerald Nachman writes that Allen, while not the first to do standup, eventually had greater impact than all the others in the 1960s, and redefined standup comedy: "He helped turn it into biting, brutally honest satirical commentary on the cultural and psychological tenor of the times."

After Allen was taken under the wing of his new manager, Jack Rollins, who had recently discovered Nichols and May, Rollins suggested he perform his written jokes as a stand-up. Allen was resistant at first, but after seeing Mort Sahl on stage, he felt safer to give it a try: "I'd never had the nerve to talk about it before. Then Mort Sahl came along with a whole new style of humor, opening up vistas for people like me." Allen made his professional stage debut at the Blue Angel nightclub in Manhattan in October 1960, where comedian Shelley Berman introduced him as a young television writer who would perform his own material.

His early stand-up shows with his different style of humor were not always well received or understood by his audiences. Unlike other comedians, Allen spoke to his audiences in a gentle and conversational style, often appearing to be searching for words, although he was well rehearsed. He acted "normal", dressed casually, and made no attempt to project a stage "personality". And he did not improvise: "I put very little premium on improvisation," he told Studs Terkel. His jokes were created from life experiences, and typically presented with a dead serious demeanor that made them funnier: "I don't think my family liked me. They put a live teddy bear in my crib."

The subjects of his jokes were rarely topical, political or socially relevant. Unlike Bruce and Sahl, he did not discuss current events such as civil rights, women's rights, the Cold War, or Vietnam. And although he was described as a "classic nebbish", he did not tell the standard Jewish jokes of the period. Comedy screenwriter Larry Gelbart compared Allen's style to Elaine May's: "He just styled himself completely after her". Like Nichols and May, he often made fun of intellectuals.

Cavett, who was among the minority to quickly appreciate Allen's style, recalls seeing the Blue Angel audience mostly ignore Allen's monologue: "I recognized immediately that there was no young comedian in the country in the same class with him for sheer brilliance of jokes, and I resented the fact that the audience was too dumb to realize what they were getting." It was his subdued stage presence that eventually became one of Allen's strongest traits, Nachman argues: "The utter absence of showbiz veneer and shtick was the best shtick any comedian had ever devised. This uneasy onstage naturalness became a trademark." When the media finally noticed, writers like The New York Timess Arthur Gelb described Allen's nebbish quality as "Chaplinesque" and "refreshing".

Allen developed an anxious, nervous, and intellectual persona for his stand-up act, a successful move that secured regular gigs for him in nightclubs and on television. He brought innovation to the comedy monologue genre and his stand-up comedy is considered influential. Allen first appeared on The Tonight Show Starring Johnny Carson on November 1, 1963, and over nine years his guest appearances included 17 in the host's chair. He subsequently released three LP albums of live nightclub recordings: the self-titled Woody Allen (1964), Volume 2 (1965), and The Third Woody Allen Album (1968), recorded at a fund-raiser for Senator Eugene McCarthy's presidential run.

In 1965, Allen filmed a half-hour standup special in England for Granada Television, titled The Woody Allen Show in the U.K. and Woody Allen: Standup Comic in the U.S. It is the only complete standup show of Allen's on film. The same year, Allen along with Nichols and May, Barbra Streisand, Carol Channing, Harry Belafonte, Julie Andrews, Carol Burnett, and Alfred Hitchcock took part in Lyndon B. Johnson’s inaugural gala in Washington, D.C., on January 18, 1965. First Lady Lady Bird Johnson described Allen and the event in her published diary, A White House Diary, writing in part, "Woody Allen, that forlorn, undernourished little comedian, stopped shooting a movie in Paris and flew across the Atlantic for about five minutes of jokes".

In 1966, Allen wrote an hourlong musical comedy television special for CBS, Gene Kelly in New York City. It focused on Gene Kelly in a musical tour around Manhattan, dancing along such landmarks as Rockefeller Center, the Plaza Hotel and the Museum of Modern Art, which serve as backdrops for the show's production numbers. Allen appeared in the special alongside Kelly. Guest stars included choreographer Gower Champion, British musical comedy star Tommy Steele, and songstress Damita Jo DeBlanc.

In 1967, Allen hosted a TV special for NBC, Woody Allen Looks at 1967. It featured Liza Minnelli, who acted alongside Allen in some skits; Aretha Franklin, the musical guest; and conservative writer William F. Buckley, the featured guest. In 1969, Allen hosted his first American special for CBS television, The Woody Allen Special, which included skits with Candice Bergen, a musical performance from the 5th Dimension, and an interview between Allen and Billy Graham.

Allen also performed standup comedy on other series, including The Andy Williams Show and The Perry Como Show, where he interacted with other guests and occasionally sang. In 1971, he hosted one of his final Tonight Shows, with guests Bob Hope and James Coco. Hope praised Allen on the show, calling him "one of the finest young talents in show business and a great delight". Life magazine put Allen on the cover of its March 21, 1969, issue.

In 1979, Allen paid tribute to one of his comedy idols, Bob Hope, at the Film Society at Lincoln Center, creating a special for the event titled "My Favorite Comedian" that included clips from Hope's films, selected and narrated by Allen. Hope said of the honor, "It's great to have your past spring up in front of your eyes, especially when it's done by Woody Allen, because he's a near genius. Not a whole genius, but a near genius". Dick Cavett served as the host, but Allen was absent, editing Manhattan. Guests at the event included Diane Keaton, Kurt Vonnegut, and Andy Warhol.

Playwright 

In 1966, Allen wrote the play Don't Drink the Water. The play starred Lou Jacobi, Kay Medford, Anita Gillette and Allen's future movie co-star Tony Roberts. A film adaptation of the play, directed by Howard Morris, was released in 1969, starring Jackie Gleason. Because he was not particularly happy with that version, in 1994 Allen directed and starred in a second version for television, with Michael J. Fox and Mayim Bialik.

The next play Allen wrote for Broadway was Play It Again, Sam, in which he also starred. The play opened on February 12, 1969, and ran for 453 performances. It featured Diane Keaton and Roberts. The play was significant to Keaton's budding career, and she has said she was in "awe" of Allen even before auditioning for her role, which was the first time she met him. In a 2013 interview Keaton said that she "fell in love with him right away", adding, "I wanted to be his girlfriend so I did something about it." After co-starring alongside Allen in the subsequent film version of Play It Again, Sam, she later co-starred in Sleeper, Love and Death, Annie Hall, Interiors and Manhattan. "He showed me the ropes and I followed his lead. He is the most disciplined person I know. He works very hard," Keaton has said.

In 1981, Allen's play The Floating Light Bulb, starring Danny Aiello and Bea Arthur, premiered on Broadway and ran for 65 performances. While receiving mixed reviews, it gave autobiographical insight into Allen's childhood, specifically his fascination with magic tricks. The play, set in 1945, is a semi-autobiographical tale of a lower-middle-class family in Brooklyn. New York Times critic Frank Rich gave the play a mild review, writing, "there are a few laughs, a few well-wrought characters, and, in Act II, a beautifully written scene that leads to a moving final curtain". Rich also compared the play to Tennessee Williams's work.

Allen has written several one-act plays off Broadway, including Riverside Drive, Old Saybrook and A Second Hand Memory, at the Variety Arts Theatre.

On March 8, 1995, Allen's one-act play Central Park West opened off-Broadway as a part of a larger piece titled Death Defying Acts, with two other one-act plays, one by David Mamet, and one by Elaine May. Critics described Allen's contribution as "the longest and most substantial of the evening".

On October 20, 2011, Allen's one-act play Honeymoon Motel opened on Broadway as part of a larger piece titled Relatively Speaking, with two other one-act plays, one by Ethan Coen and one by Elaine May.

On March 11, 2014, Allen's musical Bullets over Broadway opened on Broadway at the St. James Theatre. It was directed and choreographed by Susan Stroman and starred Zach Braff, Nick Cordero, and Betsy Wolfe. The production received mixed reviews, with The Hollywood Reporter writing, "this frothy show does provide dazzling art direction and performances, as well as effervescent ensemble numbers." Allen received a Tony Award nomination for Best Book of a Musical. The show received six Tony nominations.

Early films 
Allen's first movie was the Charles K. Feldman production What's New Pussycat? (1965), for which he wrote the screenplay. He was disappointed with the final product, which inspired him to direct every film he wrote thereafter except Play It Again, Sam. Allen's first directorial effort was What's Up, Tiger Lily? (1966, co-written with Mickey Rose), in which an existing Japanese spy movie—Kokusai himitsu keisatsu: Kagi no kagi (1965), "International Secret Police: Key of Keys"—was redubbed in English by Allen and friends with fresh new, comic dialogue. In 1967, Allen played Jimmy Bond in the James Bond spoof Casino Royale.

In 1969, Allen directed, starred in, and co-wrote (with Mickey Rose) Take the Money and Run, which he considers his true film directorial debut. The film received positive reviews; critic Vincent Canby of The New York Times wrote, "Allen has made a movie that is, in effect, a feature-length, two-reel comedy—something very special and eccentric and funny." Allen later signed a deal with United Artists to produce several films.

1970s
During the 1970s, Allen directed films that were later known as his "early, funny" work. These include Bananas (1971, co-written with Rose), Everything You Always Wanted to Know About Sex* (*But Were Afraid to Ask) (1972), Sleeper (1973), and Love and Death (1975). Sleeper was the first of four screenplays co-written by Allen and Marshall Brickman.

In 1972, Allen wrote and starred in the film version of Play It Again, Sam, directed by Herbert Ross and co-starring Diane Keaton. In 1976, he starred as cashier Howard Prince in The Front, directed by Martin Ritt. The Front was a humorous and poignant account of Hollywood blacklisting during the 1950s; Ritt, screenwriter Walter Bernstein, and three of Allen's cast-mates, Samuel "Zero" Mostel, Herschel Bernardi, and Lloyd Gough, had themselves been blacklisted.

Then came two of Allen's most popular films: Annie Hall and Manhattan. Annie Hall (1977) won four Academy Awards, including Best Picture, Best Actress in a Leading Role for Diane Keaton, Best Original Screenplay and Best Director for Woody Allen. Annie Hall set the standard for modern romantic comedy and ignited a fashion trend with the clothes Keaton wore in the film. In an interview with journalist Katie Couric, Keaton did not deny that Allen wrote the part for her and about her. The film is ranked 35th on the American Film Institute "100 Best Movies" and fourth on the AFI list of the "100 Best Comedies."

In 1979, Allen directed Manhattan, a black-and-white romantic comedy often viewed as an homage to New York City. The film features iconic scenes filmed in New York City, including an opening montage of scenes around the city, and Allen and Keaton's silhouette on a bench by the Queensboro Bridge. As in many Allen films, the main protagonists are upper-middle class writers and academics. Manhattan focuses on the complicated relationship between middle-aged Isaac Davis (Allen) and 17-year-old Tracy (Mariel Hemingway), and co-stars Diane Keaton and Meryl Streep. It was a box office and critical hit, and received two Academy Award nominations, for Hemingway for Best Supporting Actress and for Allen's screenplay.

Keaton, who has made eight movies with Allen, has said, "He just has a mind like nobody else. He's bold. He's got a lot of strength, a lot of courage in terms of his work. And that is what it takes to do something really unique. Along with a genius imagination."

1980s 
Allen's films in the 1980s, even the comedies, became somber with philosophical undertones, influenced by European directors, especially Ingmar Bergman and Federico Fellini. Stardust Memories was based on 8½, which it parodies, and Wild Strawberries. A Midsummer Night's Sex Comedy was adapted from Smiles of a Summer Night. In Hannah and Her Sisters, part of the film's structure and background is borrowed from Fanny and Alexander. Fellini's Amarcord inspired Radio Days. September resembles Bergman's Autumn Sonata. Another Woman and Crimes and Misdemeanors have elements reminiscent of Wild Strawberries.

Stardust Memories (1980) features Sandy Bates, a successful filmmaker played by Allen, who expresses resentment and scorn for his fans. Overcome by the recent death of a friend from illness, Bates says, "I don't want to make funny movies anymore" and a running gag has various people (including visiting space aliens) telling him that they appreciate his films, "especially the early, funny ones." Allen considers this one of his best films.

A Midsummer Night's Sex Comedy (1982) was the first movie Allen made starring Mia Farrow, who stepped into Diane Keaton's role when Keaton was shooting Reds. He next directed Zelig, in which he starred as a man who has the ability to transform his appearance to that of the people surrounding him.

Allen has combined tragic and comic elements in such films as Hannah and Her Sisters (1986) and Crimes and Misdemeanors (1989), in which he tells two stories that connect at the end. He also made three films about show business: Broadway Danny Rose, in which he plays a down-on-his-luck New York show business agent, The Purple Rose of Cairo, set during the Great Depression, in which a movie character comes to life to romance an unhappy housewife, and Radio Days, a film about his childhood in Brooklyn and the importance of the radio. The film co-starred Farrow in a part Allen wrote specifically for her. The Purple Rose of Cairo was named by Time as one of the 100 best films of all time. Allen called it one of his three best films with Stardust Memories and Match Point. By "best" he said he meant they came closest to his vision. In 1989, Allen and directors Francis Ford Coppola and Martin Scorsese made New York Stories, an anthology film about New Yorkers. Allen's short, Oedipus Wrecks, is about a neurotic lawyer and his critical mother. Film critic Vincent Canby of The New York Times praised the segment as a "priceless contribution" to the film.

1990s 
Allen's 1991 film Shadows and Fog is a black-and-white homage to the German expressionists and features the music of Kurt Weill. Allen then made his critically acclaimed comedy-drama Husbands and Wives (1992), which received two Oscar nominations: Best Supporting Actress for Judy Davis and Best Original Screenplay for Allen. Manhattan Murder Mystery (1993) combined suspense with dark comedy and marked the return of Diane Keaton, Alan Alda and Anjelica Huston.

He returned to lighter fare such as the showbiz comedy involving mobsters Bullets Over Broadway (1994), which earned an Academy Award nomination for Best Director, followed by a musical, Everyone Says I Love You (1996). The singing and dancing scenes in Everyone Says I Love You are similar to musicals starring Fred Astaire and Ginger Rogers. The comedy Mighty Aphrodite (1995), in which Greek drama plays a large role, won an Academy Award for Best Supporting Actress for Mira Sorvino. Allen's 1999 jazz-based comedy-drama Sweet and Lowdown was nominated for two Academy Awards, for Sean Penn (Best Actor) and Samantha Morton (Best Supporting Actress). In contrast to these lighter movies, Allen veered into darker satire toward the end of the decade with Deconstructing Harry (1997) and Celebrity (1998).

During this decade Allen also starred in the television film The Sunshine Boys (1995), based on the Neil Simon play of the same name.

Allen made one sitcom "appearance" via telephone on the show Just Shoot Me! in a 1997 episode, "My Dinner with Woody", that paid tribute to several of his films. He provided the voice of Z in DreamWorks' first animated film, Antz (1998), which featured many actors he had worked with; Allen's character was similar to his earlier roles.

2000s 
Small Time Crooks (2000) was Allen's first film with the DreamWorks studio and represented a change in direction: he began giving more interviews and made an attempt to return to his slapstick roots. The film is similar to the 1942 film Larceny, Inc. (from a play by S.J. Perelman). Allen never commented on whether this was deliberate or if his film was in any way inspired by it. Small Time Crooks was a relative financial success, grossing over $17 million domestically, but Allen's next four films foundered at the box office, including Allen's most costly film, The Curse of the Jade Scorpion (with a budget of $26 million). Hollywood Ending, Anything Else, and Melinda and Melinda have "rotten" ratings on film-review website Rotten Tomatoes and each earned less than $4 million domestically. Some critics claimed that Allen's early 2000s films were subpar and expressed concern that his best years were behind him. Others were less harsh; reviewing the little-liked Melinda and Melinda, Roger Ebert wrote, "I cannot escape the suspicion that if Woody had never made a previous film, if each new one was Woody's Sundance debut, it would get a better reception. His reputation is not a dead shark but an albatross, which with admirable economy Allen has arranged for the critics to carry around their own necks."

Match Point (2005) was one of Allen's most successful films of the decade, garnering positive reviews. Set in London, it starred Jonathan Rhys Meyers and Scarlett Johansson. It is markedly darker than Allen's first four films with DreamWorks SKG. In Match Point Allen shifts focus from the intellectual upper class of New York to the moneyed upper class of London. The film earned more than $23 million domestically (more than any of his films in nearly 20 years) and over $62 million in international box office sales. It earned Allen his first Academy Award nomination since 1998, for Best Writing – Original Screenplay, with directing and writing nominations at the Golden Globes, his first Globe nominations since 1987. In a 2006 interview with Premiere Magazine he said it was the best film he had ever made.

Allen reached an agreement to film Vicky Cristina Barcelona in Avilés, Barcelona, and Oviedo, Spain, where shooting started on July 9, 2007. The movie featured Scarlett Johansson, Javier Bardem, Rebecca Hall and Penélope Cruz. The film premiered at the 2008 Cannes Film Festival to rapturous reviews, and became a box office success. Vicky Cristina Barcelona won Best Motion Picture – Musical or Comedy at the Golden Globe awards. Cruz received the Academy Award for Best Supporting Actress.

"In the United States things have changed a lot, and it's hard to make good small films now," Allen said in a 2004 interview. "The avaricious studios couldn't care less about good films—if they get a good film they're twice as happy but money-making films are their goal. They only want these $100 million pictures that make $500 million."

In April 2008 he began filming Whatever Works, a film aimed more toward older audiences, starring Larry David, Patricia Clarkson, and Evan Rachel Wood. Released in 2009 and described as a dark comedy, it follows the story of a botched suicide attempt turned messy love triangle. Whatever Works was written by Allen in the 1970s, and David's character was written for Zero Mostel, who died the year Annie Hall came out.

Allen was elected a Fellow of the American Academy of Arts and Sciences in 2001.

2010s 

You Will Meet a Tall Dark Stranger, filmed in London, stars Antonio Banderas, Josh Brolin, Anthony Hopkins, Anupam Kher, Freida Pinto and Naomi Watts. Filming started in July 2009. It was released theatrically in the US on September 23, 2010, following a Cannes debut in May 2010, and a screening at the Toronto International Film Festival on September 12, 2010.

Allen announced that his next film would be titled Midnight in Paris starring Owen Wilson, Marion Cotillard, Rachel McAdams, Michael Sheen, Corey Stoll, Allison Pill, Tom Hiddleston, Adrien Brody, Kathy Bates, and Carla Bruni, the First Lady of France at the time of production. The film follows a young engaged couple in Paris who see their lives transformed. It debuted at the 2011 Cannes Film Festival on May 12, 2011. Allen said he wanted to "show the city emotionally" during the press conference. "I just wanted it to be the way I saw Paris—Paris through my eyes," he added. The film was almost universally praised, receiving a 93% on Rotten Tomatoes. Midnight in Paris won the Academy Award for Best Original Screenplay and became his highest-grossing film, making $151 million worldwide on a $17 million budget.

In February 2012, Allen appeared on a panel at the 92nd Street Y in New York City with moderators Dick Cavett and Annette Insdorf, discussing his films and career.

His next film, To Rome with Love, was a Rome-set comedy released in 2012. The film was structured in four vignettes featuring dialogue in both Italian and English. It marked Allen's return to acting since his last role in Scoop.

Blue Jasmine debuted in July 2013. The film is set in San Francisco and New York, and stars Alec Baldwin, Cate Blanchett, Louis C.K., Andrew Dice Clay, Sally Hawkins, and Peter Sarsgaard. Opening to critical acclaim, the film earned Allen another Academy Award nomination for Best Original Screenplay, and Blanchett received the Academy Award for Best Actress. Allen co-starred with John Turturro in Fading Gigolo, written and directed by Turturro, which premiered in September 2013. In 2013 Allen shot the romantic comedy Magic in the Moonlight with Emma Stone, and Colin Firth in Nice, France. The film is set in the 1920s on the French Riviera. The film was a modest financial success, earning $51 million off a budget of $16 million.

From July to August 2014 Allen filmed the mystery drama Irrational Man in Newport, Rhode Island, with Joaquin Phoenix, Emma Stone, Parker Posey and Jamie Blackley. Allen said that this film, as well as the next three he had planned, had the financing and full support of Sony Pictures Classics. His next film, Café Society, starred an ensemble cast, including Jesse Eisenberg, Kristen Stewart, and Blake Lively. Bruce Willis was set to co-star, but was replaced by Steve Carell during filming. The film is distributed by Amazon Studios, and opened the 2016 Cannes Film Festival on May 11, 2016, the third time Allen has opened the festival.

On January 14, 2015, Amazon Studios announced a full-season order for a half-hour Amazon Prime Instant Video series that Allen would write and direct, marking the first time he has developed a television show. Allen said of the series, "I don't know how I got into this. I have no ideas and I'm not sure where to begin. My guess is that Roy Price [the head of Amazon Studios] will regret this." At the 2015 Cannes Film Festival, Allen said, in reference to his upcoming Amazon show, "It was a catastrophic mistake. I don't know what I'm doing. I'm floundering. I expect this to be a cosmic embarrassment." On September 30, 2016, Amazon Video debuted Allen's first television series production, Crisis in Six Scenes. The series is a comedy that takes place during the 1960s. It focuses on the life of a suburban family after a surprise visitor creates chaos among them. It stars Allen alongside Elaine May and Miley Cyrus, with the latter playing a radical hippie fugitive who sells marijuana.

In September 2016 Allen started filming Wonder Wheel, set in the 1950s in Coney Island, and starring Kate Winslet and Justin Timberlake. The film served as the closing night selection at the 55th New York Film Festival on October 15, 2017, and was theatrically released on December 1, 2017, as the first movie self-distributed to theaters by Amazon Studios.

In 2017, Allen received a standing ovation when he made a rare public appearance at the 45th Annual Life Achievement Tribute award ceremony for Diane Keaton. Before presenting her with the award he spoke about their longtime collaboration and friendship, saying, "From the minute I met her, she was a great, great inspiration to me. Much of what I have accomplished in my life I owe for sure to her".

His film A Rainy Day in New York, starring Timothée Chalamet, Selena Gomez, Elle Fanning, Jude Law, Diego Luna, Liev Schreiber and Rebecca Hall began production in New York in September 2017. Chalamet, Gomez and Hall announced, in the light of the #MeToo movement, that they would be donating their salaries to various charities.

In February 2019 it was announced that Amazon Studios had dropped A Rainy Day in New York and would no longer finance, produce, or distribute films with Allen. He filed a lawsuit for $68 million, alleging Amazon gave "vague reasons" to terminate the contract, dropped the film over "a 25-year old, baseless allegation" and did not make payments. The case was later settled and dismissed. It was released throughout Europe beginning in July 2019, receiving mixed reviews and grossing $20 million at the box office. After over a year of delays, the film was released in the United States on October 9, 2020, by MPI Media Group and Signature Entertainment.

2020s 
In May 2019, it was announced that Allen's latest film would be titled Rifkin's Festival, and Variety magazine confirmed that its cast would include Christoph Waltz, Elena Anaya, Louis Garrel, Gina Gershon, Sergi López and Wallace Shawn and it would be produced by Gravier Productions. The film was produced with Mediapro, an independent Spanish TV-film company. Rifkin's Festival completed filming in October 2019. On September 18, 2020, it premiered at the San Sebastián International Film Festival. It received mixed reviews, though Jessica Kiang of The New York Times called it "to the ravenous captive, like finding an unexpected stash of dessert".

On March 2, 2020, it was announced that Grand Central Publishing would release Allen's autobiography, Apropos of Nothing, on April 7, 2020, This was after it was announced Allen had written a memoir and shopped it around to multiple prominent publishers, which rejected it. The book was set to be released in the United States, Canada, Italy, Spain, and France, among others. According to the publisher, the book is a "comprehensive account of Allen's life, both personal and professional, and describes his work in films, theater, television, nightclubs, and print...Allen also writes of his relationships with family, friends, and the loves of his life."

The decision to publish the book was met with backlash from Ronan Farrow, who cut ties with the publisher. Dylan Farrow also responded to the announcement of the release, saying, "Hachette's publishing of Woody Allen's memoir is deeply upsetting to me personally and an utter betrayal of my brother." On March 5, 2020, 75 employees of Grand Central Publishing held a walkout to protest the release. On March 6, the publisher announced that it had canceled the book's release and returned the rights to Allen, saying, "The decision to cancel Mr. Allen's book was a difficult one. Over the past few days, HBG leadership had extensive conversations with our staff and others. After listening, we came to the conclusion that moving forward with publication would not be feasible for HBG."

Novelist Stephen King criticized Hachette's decision to withdraw the book, saying it "makes me very uneasy. It's not him; I don't give a damn about Mr. Allen. It's who gets muzzled next that worries me." Executive director of PEN America Suzanne Nossel also criticized the decision. On March 6, 2020, Manuel Carcassonne of Hachette's French branch, the publishing company Stock, announced it would publish the book if Allen permitted it. On March 23, 2020, Arcade published the memoir in English and La nave di Teseo published it in Italian.

In June 2020, Allen appeared on Alec Baldwin's podcast Here's the Thing and talked about his career as a standup comedian, comedy writer, and filmmaker, and his life during the COVID-19 pandemic.

In September 2022, Allen suggested that he might retire from filmmaking after the release of his next film, previously carrying the working title Wasp 22 (Woody Allen Summer Project 2022) and now known to be titled Coup de Chance. In an interview with La Vanguardia, Allen said, "My idea, in principle, is not to make more movies and focus on writing." Allen's publicist later said, "Woody Allen never said he was retiring, nor did he say he was writing another novel. He said he was thinking about not making films, as making films that go straight or very quickly to streaming platforms is not so enjoyable for him, as he is a great lover of the cinema experience. Currently, he has no intention of retiring and is very excited to be in Paris shooting his new movie, which will be the 50th."

Theater 
While best known for his films, Allen has also had a successful theater career, starting as early as 1960, when he wrote sketches for the revue From A to Z. His first great success was Don't Drink the Water, which opened in 1968 and ran for 598 performances on Broadway. His success continued with Play It Again, Sam, which opened in 1969, starring Allen and Diane Keaton. The show played for 453 performances and was nominated for three Tony Awards, although none of the nominations were for Allen's writing or acting.

In the 1970s, Allen wrote a number of one-act plays, most notably God and Death, which were published in his 1975 collection Without Feathers. In 1981, Allen's play The Floating Light Bulb opened on Broadway. It was a critical success and a commercial flop. Despite two Tony Award nominations, a Tony win for the acting of Brian Backer (who won the 1981 Theater World Award and a Drama Desk Award for his work), the play only ran for 62 performances. After a long hiatus from the stage, Allen returned to theater in 1995 with the one-act Central Park West, an installment in an evening of theater, Death Defying Acts, that also included new work by David Mamet and Elaine May.

For the next few years, Allen had no direct involvement with the stage, but notable productions of his work were staged. God was staged at The Bank of Brazil Cultural Center in Rio de Janeiro, and theatrical adaptations of Allen's films Bullets Over Broadway and September were produced in Italy and France, respectively, without Allen's involvement. In 2003, Allen finally returned to the stage with Writer's Block, an evening of two one-acts—Old Saybrook and Riverside Drive—that played Off-Broadway. The production marked his stage-directing debut and sold out the entire run.

In 2004, Allen's first full-length play since 1981, A Second Hand Memory, was directed by Allen and enjoyed an extended run Off-Broadway. In June 2007 it was announced that Allen would make two more creative debuts in the theater, directing a work he did not write and an opera—a reinterpretation of Puccini's Gianni Schicchi for the Los Angeles Opera—which debuted at the Dorothy Chandler Pavilion on September 6, 2008. Of his direction of the opera, Allen said, "I have no idea what I'm doing." His production of the opera opened the Festival of Two Worlds in Spoleto, Italy, in June 2009.

In October 2011, Allen's one-act play Honeymoon Motel premiered as one in a series of one-act plays on Broadway titled Relatively Speaking. Also contributing to the series were Elaine May and Ethan Coen; John Turturro directed.

It was announced in February 2012 that Allen would adapt Bullets over Broadway into a Broadway musical. It ran from April 10 to August 24, 2014. The cast included Zach Braff, Nick Cordero and Betsy Wolfe. The show was directed and choreographed by Susan Stroman, known for directing the stage and film productions of Mel Brooks's The Producers. The show drew mixed reviews from critics but received six Tony Award nominations, including one for Allen for Best Book of a Musical.

Jazz band 
 Allen is a passionate fan of jazz, which appears often in the soundtracks to his films. He began playing clarinet as a child and took his stage name from clarinetist Woody Herman. He has performed publicly at least since the late 1960s, including with the Preservation Hall Jazz Band on the soundtrack of Sleeper.

Woody Allen and his New Orleans Jazz Band have been playing each Monday evening at the Carlyle Hotel in Manhattan for many years specializing in New Orleans jazz from the early 20th century. He plays songs by Sidney Bechet, George Lewis, Johnny Dodds, Jimmie Noone, and Louis Armstrong. The documentary film Wild Man Blues (directed by Barbara Kopple) chronicles a 1996 European tour by Allen and his band, as well as his relationship with Previn. The band released the albums The Bunk Project (1993) and the soundtrack of Wild Man Blues (1997). In a 2011 review of a concert by Allen's jazz band, critic Kirk Silsbee of the Los Angeles Times suggested that Allen should be regarded a competent musical hobbyist with a sincere appreciation for early jazz: "Allen's clarinet won't make anyone forget Sidney Bechet, Barney Bigard or Evan Christopher. His piping tone and strings of staccato notes can't approximate melodic or lyrical phrasing. Still his earnestness and the obvious regard he has for traditional jazz counts for something."

Allen and his band played at the Montreal International Jazz Festival on two consecutive nights in June 2008. For many years he wanted to make a film about the origins of jazz in New Orleans. Tentatively titled American Blues, the film would follow the different careers of Louis Armstrong and Sidney Bechet. Allen stated that the film would cost between $80 and $100 million and is therefore unlikely to be made.

Influence 
Allen has said that he was enormously influenced by comedians Bob Hope, Groucho Marx, Mort Sahl, Charlie Chaplin, W.C. Fields, playwright George S. Kaufman and filmmakers Ernst Lubitsch and Ingmar Bergman.

Many comedians have cited Allen as an influence, including Louis C.K., Larry David, Jon Stewart, Chris Rock, Steve Martin, John Mulaney, Bill Hader, Aziz Ansari, Sarah Silverman, Conan O'Brien, Seth MacFarlane, Seth Meyers, Richard Ayoade, Bill Maher, Albert Brooks, John Cleese, Garry Shandling, Bob Odenkirk, Richard Kind, and Rob McElhenney.

Many filmmakers have also cited Allen as an influence, including Wes Anderson, Greta Gerwig, Noah Baumbach, Luca Guadagnino, Nora Ephron, Whit Stillman, Mike Mills, Ira Sachs, Richard Linklater, Charlie Kaufman, Nicole Holofcener, Rebecca Miller, Tamara Jenkins, Alex Ross Perry, Greg Mottola, Lynn Shelton, Lena Dunham, Lawrence Michael Levine, Olivier Assayas, and the Safdie brothers.

Directors who admire Allen's work include Quentin Tarantino, who called him "one of the greatest screenwriters of all time", as well as Martin Scorsese, who said in Woody Allen: A Documentary, "Woody's sensibilities of New York City is one of the reasons why I love his work, but they are extremely foreign to me. It's not another world; it's another planet". Stanley Donen stated he liked Allen's films, Spike Lee has called Allen a "great, great filmmaker" and Pedro Almodóvar has said he admires Allen's work. In 2012, directors Mike Leigh, Asghar Farhadi, and Martin McDonagh respectively included Radio Days (1987), Take the Money and Run (1969), and Manhattan among their Top 10 films for Sight & Sound. Other admirers of his work include Olivia Wilde and Jason Reitman, who staged live readings of Hannah and Her Sisters and Manhattan respectively. Filmmaker Edgar Wright listed five of Allen's films (Take the Money and Run, Bananas, Play It Again, Sam, Sleeper, Annie Hall) in his list of 100 Favorite Comedy films.

Bill Hader cited Allen's mockumentary films Take the Money and Run and Zelig as the biggest inspirations of the IFC series Documentary Now!.

Film critics including Roger Ebert and Barry Norman have highly praised Allen's work. In 1980, on Sneak Previews, Siskel and Ebert called Allen and Mel Brooks "the two most successful comedy directors in the world today ... America's two funniest filmmakers." Pauline Kael wrote of Allen that "his comic character is enormously appealing to people partly because he's the smart, urban guy who at the same time is intelligent, is vulnerable, and somehow by his intelligence, he triumphs".

Favorite films 
In 2012, Allen participated in the Sight & Sound film polls. Held every ten years to select the greatest films of all time, contemporary directors were asked to select ten films of their choice. Allen's choices, in alphabetical order, were:
 The 400 Blows (France, 1959)
 8½ (Italy, 1963)
 Amarcord (Italy, 1972)
 Bicycle Thieves (Italy, 1948)
 Citizen Kane (USA, 1941)
 The Discreet Charm of the Bourgeoisie (France, 1972)
 La Grande Illusion (France, 1937)
 Paths of Glory (USA, 1957)
 Rashomon (Japan, 1950)
 The Seventh Seal (Sweden, 1957)

In his 2020 autobiography Apropos of Nothing Allen praised Elia Kazan's A Streetcar Named Desire (1951):

Film activism and preservation 

In 1987, Allen joined Ginger Rogers, Sydney Pollack, and Miloš Forman at a Senate Judiciary committee hearing in Washington, D.C., where they each gave testimony against Ted Turner's and other companies' colorizing films without the artists' consent. Only one senator, Patrick Leahy, was present for the testimony. Allen testified:

Allen also spoke about his decisions to make films in black and white, such as Manhattan, Stardust Memories, Broadway Danny Rose, and Zelig. Film director John Huston appeared in a pretaped video, and Rogers read a statement by Jimmy Stewart criticizing the colorization of his film It's a Wonderful Life.

In 1990, Allen and Martin Scorsese created The Film Foundation, a nonprofit film preservation organization that collaborates with film studios to restore prints of old or damaged films. Allen sat on the foundation's original board of directors alongside Robert Altman, Francis Ford Coppola, Clint Eastwood, Stanley Kubrick, George Lucas, Sydney Pollack, Robert Redford, and Steven Spielberg.

Works

Filmography

Theatrical works 
In addition to directing, writing, and acting in films, Allen has written and performed in a number of Broadway theater productions.

Bibliography 

 Getting Even (1971)
 Without Feathers (1975)
 Side Effects (1980)
 The Insanity Defense: The Complete Prose (2007)
 Mere Anarchy (2007)
 Apropos of Nothing (2020)
 Zero Gravity (2022)

Discography 
 Woody Allen (Colpix Records, 1964)
 Woody Allen Vol. 2 (Colpix Records, 1965)
 The Third Woody Allen Album (Capitol Records, 1968)
 The Nightclub Years 1964–1968 (United Artists Records, 1972)
 Standup Comic (Casablanca Records, 1978)
 Wild Man Blues (RCA Victor, 1998)

Awards and honors

Over his more than 50-year film career, Allen has received many award nominations. He holds the record for most Academy Award nominations for Best Original Screenplay, with 16 nominations and three wins (Annie Hall, Hannah and Her Sisters, and Midnight in Paris). Allen has been nominated for Best Director seven times and won for Annie Hall. Three of Allen's films have been nominated for Academy Award for Best Picture, Annie Hall, Hannah and Her Sisters, and Midnight in Paris.

Allen shuns award ceremonies, citing their subjectivity. His first and only appearance at the Academy Awards was at the 2002 Oscars, where he received a standing ovation. As a New York icon, he had been asked by the Academy to introduce a film montage of clips of New York City in the movies that Nora Ephron compiled to honor the city after the 9/11 attacks.

Allen has received numerous honors, including an Honorary Golden Palm from the Cannes Film Festival in 2002 and a Career Golden Lion from the Venice International Film Festival in 1995. He also received a BAFTA Fellowship in 1997, a Lifetime Achievement Award from the Directors Guild of America and a Golden Globe Cecil B. DeMille Award in 2014. He was elected a member of the American Philosophical Society in 2010. In 2015, the Writers Guild of America named his screenplay for Annie Hall first on its list of the "101 Funniest Screenplays". In 2011, PBS televised the film biography Woody Allen: A Documentary on its series American Masters.

Personal life 
Allen has been married three times: to Harlene Rosen from 1956 to 1959, Louise Lasser from 1966 to 1970, and Soon-Yi Previn since 1997. He also had a 12-year relationship with actress Mia Farrow and relationships with Stacey Nelkin and Diane Keaton.

Early marriages and relationships 
In 1956, Allen married Harlene Rosen. He was 20 and she was 17. The marriage lasted until 1959. Rosen, whom Allen called "the Dread Mrs. Allen" in his standup act, sued him for defamation as a result of comments he made during a television appearance shortly after their divorce. In his mid-1960s album Standup Comic, Allen said that Rosen had sued him because of a joke he made in an interview. Rosen had been sexually assaulted outside her apartment. According to Allen, the newspapers reported that she had been "violated". In the interview, Allen said, "Knowing my ex-wife, it probably wasn't a moving violation." In an interview on The Dick Cavett Show, Allen repeated his comments and said he had been sued for "$1 million".

In 1966, Allen married Louise Lasser. They divorced in 1970. Lasser provided voice dubbing in Allen's What's Up, Tiger Lily? and appeared in three of his other films: Take the Money and Run, Bananas, and Everything You Always Wanted to Know About Sex* (*But Were Afraid to Ask). She also appeared briefly in Stardust Memories.

According to the Los Angeles Times, Manhattan was based on Allen's romantic relationship with actress Stacey Nelkin. Her bit part in Annie Hall ended up on the cutting room floor, and their relationship, never publicly acknowledged by Allen, reportedly began when she was 17 and a student at Stuyvesant High School in New York. In December 2018 The Hollywood Reporter interviewed Babi Christina Engelhardt, who said she had an eight-year affair with Allen that began in 1976 when she was 17 years old (they met when she was 16), and that she believes the character of Tracy in Manhattan is a composite of any number of Allen's presumed other real-life young paramours from that period, not necessarily Nelkin or Engelhardt. When asked, Allen declined to comment.

Diane Keaton 

In 1968, Allen cast Diane Keaton in his Broadway show Play It Again, Sam. During the run she and Allen became romantically involved. Although they broke up after a year, she continued to star in his films, including Sleeper as a futuristic poet and Love and Death as a composite character based on the novels of Tolstoy and Dostoevsky. Annie Hall was very important in Allen's and Keaton's careers. It is said that the role was written for her, as Keaton's birth name was Diane Hall. She then starred in Interiors as a poet, followed by Manhattan. In 1987, she had a cameo as a nightclub singer in Radio Days, and she was chosen to replace Mia Farrow in Manhattan Murder Mystery after Allen and Farrow began having problems with their relationship. In total Keaton has starred in eight of Allen's films. As of 2018 Keaton and Allen remain close friends. In a rare public appearance, Allen presented Keaton with the AFI Life Achievement Award in 2017.

Mia Farrow 
Allen and Mia Farrow met in 1979 and began a relationship in 1980; Farrow starred in 13 of Allen's films from 1982 to 1992. Throughout the relationship they lived in separate apartments on opposite sides of Central Park in Manhattan. Farrow had seven children when they met: three biological sons from her marriage to composer André Previn, three adopted girls (two Vietnamese and one South Korean, Soon-Yi Previn), and an adopted South Korean boy, Moses Farrow.

In 1984, she and Allen tried to conceive a child together; Allen agreed to this on the understanding that he need not be involved in the child's care. When the effort failed, Farrow adopted a baby girl, Dylan Farrow, in July 1985. Allen was not involved in the adoption, but when Dylan arrived he assumed a parental role toward her and began spending more time in Farrow's home. On December 19, 1987, Farrow gave birth to their son Satchel Farrow (later known as Ronan Farrow). According to Allen, his intimate relationship with Mia Farrow ceased completely after Satchel's birth and he was asked to return her apartment key; they maintained a working relationship when they filmed a movie, and he regularly visited Moses, Dylan and Satchel, but he and Mia were only "social companions on those occasions where there'd be a dinner, an event, but after the event she'd go home and I'd go home." In 1991, Farrow wanted to adopt another child. According to a 1993 custody hearing, Allen told her he would not object to another adoption so long as she would agree to his adoption of Dylan and Moses; that adoption was finalized in December 1991. Eric Lax, Allen's biographer, wrote in The New York Times that Allen was "there before they [the children] wake up in the morning, he sees them during the day and he helps put them to bed at night".

Soon-Yi Previn 

In 1977, Mia Farrow and André Previn adopted Soon-Yi Previn from Seoul, South Korea. She had been abandoned. The Seoul Family Court established a Family Census Register (legal birth document) on her behalf on December 28, 1976, with a presumptive birth date of October 8, 1970; according to Maureen Orth, a bone scan in the U.S. estimated that she was between five and seven years old. According to Previn, her first friendly interaction with Allen took place when she was injured playing soccer during 11th grade and Allen offered to transport her to school. After her injury, she began attending New York Knicks basketball games with Allen in 1990. They attended more games and by 1991 had become closer. In September 1991, she began studies at Drew University in New Jersey.

In January 1992, Farrow found nude photographs of Previn in Allen's home. Allen, then 56, told Farrow that he had taken the photos the day before, approximately two weeks after he first had sex with Previn. Both Farrow and Allen contacted lawyers shortly after the photographs were discovered. Previn was asked to leave summer camp because she was spending too much time taking calls from a "Mr. Simon", who turned out to be Allen.

In an August 1992 interview with Time Magazine Allen said, "I am not Soon-Yi's father or stepfather", adding, "I've never even lived with Mia. I've never in my entire life slept at Mia's apartment, and I never even used to go over there until my children came along seven years ago. I never had any family dinners over there. I was not a father to her adopted kids in any sense of the word." Adding that Soon-Yi never treated him as a father figure and that he rarely spoke to her before their romantic relationship, Allen seemed to see few or no problems with their relationship.

On August 17, 1992, Allen issued a statement saying that he was in love with Previn. Their relationship became public and "erupted into tabloid headlines and late-night monologues in August 1992."

Allen and Previn were married in Venice, Italy, on December 23, 1997. They have adopted two children, and live in the Carnegie Hill section of Manhattan's Upper East Side.

Sexual abuse allegation 

According to court testimony, on August 4, 1992, Allen visited the children at Mia Farrow's home in Bridgewater, Connecticut, while she was shopping with a friend. The next day, that friend's babysitter told her employer that she had seen that "Dylan was sitting on the sofa, and Woody was kneeling on the floor, facing her, with his head in her lap". When Farrow asked Dylan about it, Dylan allegedly said that Allen had touched Dylan's "private part" while they were alone together in the attic. Allen strongly denied the allegation, calling it "an unconscionable and gruesomely damaging manipulation of innocent children for vindictive and self-serving motives". He then began proceedings in New York Supreme Court for sole custody of his and Farrow's son Satchel, as well as Dylan and Moses, their two adopted children. In March 1993, a six-month investigation by the Child Sexual Abuse Clinic of Yale-New Haven Hospital concluded that Dylan had not been sexually abused.

In June 1993, Judge Elliott Wilk rejected Allen's bid for custody and rejected the allegation of sexual abuse. Wilk said he was less certain than the Yale-New Haven team that there was conclusive evidence that there was no sexual abuse and called Allen's conduct with Dylan "grossly inappropriate", although not sexual. In September 1993, the state prosecutor announced that despite having "probable cause”, he would not pursue charges in order "to avoid the unjustifiable risk of exposing a child to the rigors and uncertainties of a questionable prosecution". In October 1993 the New York Child Welfare Agency of the State Department of Social Services closed a 14-month investigation and concluded there was not credible evidence of abuse or maltreatment, and the allegation was unfounded.

In 2014, when Allen received a Golden Globe Cecil B. DeMille Award for Lifetime Achievement, the issue returned to the forefront of media attention, with Mia Farrow and Ronan Farrow making disparaging remarks about Allen on Twitter. On February 1, 2014, New York Times journalist Nicholas Kristof, with Dylan's permission, published a column that included excerpts from a letter Dylan had written to Kristof restating the allegation against Allen, and called out fellow actors who have continued to work in his films. Allen responded to the allegation in an open letter, also in The New York Times, strongly denying it. "Of course, I did not molest Dylan...No one wants to discourage abuse victims from speaking out, but one must bear in mind that sometimes there are people who are falsely accused and that is also a terribly destructive thing", he wrote.

In 2018, Moses Farrow (Mia Farrow's and Allen's adopted son who was present at her Bridgewater house during Allen's visit) published a blog post called "A Son Speaks Out." In the post, Moses recounted a series of instances of alleged physical abuse at the hands of Mia Farrow. He wrote, "It pains me to recall instances in which I witnessed siblings, some blind or physically disabled, dragged down a flight of stairs to be thrown into a bedroom or a closet, then having the door locked from the outside. [Mia] even shut my brother Thaddeus, paraplegic from polio, in an outdoor shed overnight as punishment for a minor transgression".

Works about Allen 
From 1976 to 1984 Stuart Hample wrote and drew Inside Woody Allen, a comic strip based on Allen's film persona.

The 1997 documentary Wild Man Blues, directed by Barbara Kopple, focuses on Allen, and other documentaries featuring Allen include the 2002 cable television documentary Woody Allen: A Life in Film, directed by Time film critic Richard Schickel, which interlaces interviews of Allen with clips of his films, and the 1986 short film Meetin' WA, in which Allen is interviewed by French New Wave director Jean-Luc Godard.

In 2003, a life-size bronze statue of Allen was installed in Oviedo, Spain. He had visited the city the previous year to accept a Prince of Asturias Award.

In 2011 the PBS series American Masters co-produced the documentary Woody Allen: A Documentary, directed by Robert B. Weide. New interviews provide insight and backstory with Diane Keaton, Scarlett Johansson, Penélope Cruz, Dianne Wiest, Larry David, Chris Rock, Martin Scorsese, Dick Cavett, and Leonard Maltin, among others.

Eric Lax wrote the book Woody Allen: A Biography.

In 2015 David Evanier published Woody: The Biography, which was billed as the first new biography of Allen in over a decade.

In early March 2020, Grand Central Publishing, a division of Hachette Book Group, announced that it would publish Allen's memoir, Apropos of Nothing, on April 7, 2020. Days later, after employee walkouts, parent company Hachette announced that the title was canceled and rights had reverted to Allen. On March 23, 2020, Skyhorse Publishing announced that it had acquired and released Apropos of Nothing through its Arcade imprint.

In February 2021, HBO released Kirby Dick's and Amy Ziering's four-part documentary Allen v. Farrow, which explores the sexual abuse allegations against Allen. The series drew largely positive reviews from critics. Lorraine Ali of the Los Angeles Times wrote that it "makes a compelling argument that Allen got away with the unthinkable thanks to his fame, money, and revered standing in the world of film—and that a little girl never received justice." Rachel Brodsky wrote in The Independent that the "documentary will sound the death knell for Woody Allen’s career." Hadley Freeman in The Guardian wrote that the series "sets itself up as an investigation but much more resembles PR, as biased and partial as a political candidate’s advert vilifying an opponent in election season." A statement on behalf of Allen and Previn denounced the documentary as "a hatchet job riddled with falsehoods" and said that they were approached two months before it was aired on HBO and "given only a matter of days 'to respond.' Of course, they declined to do so." The filmmakers said they gave Allen and Previn two weeks to comment, which is "more than ample time by journalistic standards."

Notes

References

Works cited

External links 

 
 
 
 
 
 
 
 
 
  (Fresh Air), June 15, 2009

 
1935 births
Living people
20th-century American dramatists and playwrights
20th-century American male actors
20th-century American male writers
20th-century American musicians
21st-century American dramatists and playwrights
21st-century American male actors
21st-century American male writers
21st-century American musicians
21st-century clarinetists
American film producers
American humorists
American jazz clarinetists
American male comedians
American male comedy actors
American male dramatists and playwrights
American male film actors
American male jazz musicians
American male musicians
American male non-fiction writers
American male screenwriters
American male short story writers
American parodists
American people of Austrian-Jewish descent
American people of Lithuanian-Jewish descent
American people of Russian-Jewish descent
American satirists
American short story writers
American stand-up comedians
American Ashkenazi Jews
BAFTA fellows
Best Directing Academy Award winners
Best Director BAFTA Award winners
Best Original Screenplay Academy Award winners
Best Original Screenplay BAFTA Award winners
Best Screenplay BAFTA Award winners
Capitol Records artists
Cecil B. DeMille Award Golden Globe winners
César Award winners
Colpix Records artists
Comedians from New York City
Comedy film directors
Parody film directors
David di Donatello winners
Directors Guild of America Award winners
Dixieland clarinetists
Entertainers from the Bronx
Fellows of the American Academy of Arts and Sciences
Film directors from New York City
Filmmakers who won the Best Film BAFTA Award
Grammy Award winners
Hugo Award-winning writers
Independent Spirit Award winners
Jazz musicians from New York (state)
Jewish American male actors
Jewish American male comedians
Jewish American musicians
Jewish dramatists and playwrights
Jewish humorists
Jewish male comedians
Jewish singers
Jews and Judaism in New York City
Male actors from New York City
Midwood High School alumni
Nebula Award winners
O. Henry Award winners
People from Midwood, Brooklyn
People from the Upper East Side
Postmodernist filmmakers
Screenwriters from New York (state)
Tisch School of the Arts alumni
Writers from Brooklyn
Writers Guild of America Award winners
Jewish American comedy writers
Audiobook narrators